Ogle Creek is a headwaters tributary, about  long, of the Molalla River in the northwestern part of Oregon in the United States. From its source in the Cascade Range, it flows north from far-northern Marion County into Clackamas County near Ogle Mountain.

Ogle Creek was named for Bob Ogle, a Molalla prospector who found gold along the creek in 1862. An Oregon City Mining Company employee had found placer gold along the upper Molalla in 1860. Over the next 40 years, many others filed mining claims in the Molalla watershed. The biggest claimant, the Ogle Mountain Mining Company, operated the Ogle Mountain Mine between 1903 and 1915. Limited mining continued here until 1953, when Weyerhaeuser bought the land for timber.

See also
List of rivers of Oregon

References

Rivers of Clackamas County, Oregon
Rivers of Marion County, Oregon
Rivers of Oregon